Kagawa Yosui Choseichi  is an earthfill dam located in Kagawa Prefecture in Japan. The dam is used for water supply. The catchment area of the dam is 0.6 km2. The dam impounds about 24  ha of land when full and can store 3070 thousand cubic meters of water. The construction of the dam was started on 1999 and completed in 2008.

See also
List of dams in Japan

References

Dams in Kagawa Prefecture